Parthenocissus semicordata (Wall) Planch. 1811 (synonym: P. himalayana) is a creeper related to the grapevine family. It is a native plant of the Himalaya. Its name is derived from Latin 'corda' meaning heart.

Growth
Parthenocissus semicordata can grow in pots or on slopes.  It is propagated from seeds or cuttings.

Characteristics
Parthenocissus semicordata is a vigorous climber. It has trifoliate leaves. Like most of the species of Parthenocissus it uses suction cups to hold itself to walls or trees.  It has small fruit which look like grapes and are dark blue, almost black when ripe.

References

External links
Asianflora.com (Parthenocissus-himalayana)  (retrieved on 27-09-2010)

semicordata